OMAS (an acronym for "Officina Meccanica Armando Simoni") is an Italian manufacturing company of writing implements, founded in 1925, put in liquidation in January 2016, and revived in 2018. Their products of great quality and luxury and have always been manufactured in their factory located in Bologna.

Products manufactured included fountain pens, ink and related luxury goods. In 2018, another Italian penmaker, Ancora, announced the acquisition of OMAS brand and assets and the relaunching of its products.

History 
The company was founded by Armando Simoni as "Officina Meccanica Armando Simoni" (abbreviated OMAS), setting up in Bologna. Simoni also designed the tools and equipment needed to manufacturer fountain pens.

OMAS manufactured a variety of pens, the top line being the faceted "Arte Italiana" range, as well as a variety of limited edition pens. In their history, they introduced a number of cutting edge designs including the "doctor's pen" (which had a tiny built-in clinical thermometer) and the double-nibbed Itala in the 1920s and the 361 model in the late 1940s whose nib could be used as a hard writer if handled in one position and as a flexible writer in another. Their last major design innovation was the 360, a fountain pen with a triangular body to maximize grip and writing comfort, launched in 1996.

The largest size pen manufactured as a non-limited edition in their most current production was the 12-faceted Paragon, the second largest being the Milord. OMAS' product range was last updated in 2005. The Milord model became the size of the pre-2005 Paragon model. OMAS continued to release limited editions based on their earlier style of pens.

In 2000, the French company LVMH acquired OMAS from the heirs of Armando Simoni. It was the only writing instrument company in its suite of companies. In October 2007 the Hengdeli Holdings Limited of Hong Kong purchased 90% equity stake in OMAS. Xinyu had a strategic partnership with LVMH and planned to use OMAS for its expansion of luxury goods in the Asian market. The company continued to be unprofitable, and was sold to another Chinese company, O-Luxe, in 2011.

O-Luxe decided to close OMAS in November 2015 and the company entered voluntary liquidation in January 2016, ceasing all trading. The Turners Workshop Ltd, bought the remaining stock of Acrylics  Ebonite and Caseins from the factory closure

In June 2018 it was announced that Ancora, another Italian penmaker, had acquired OMAS and that production would be resumed with OMAS remaining a separate brand, retaining its classic models and using the materials inherited from the former company.

References

External links 
 Official website

Manufacturing companies based in Bologna
Fountain pen and ink manufacturers
LVMH brands
Manufacturing companies established in 1925
Italian brands
Design companies established in 1925
Manufacturing companies disestablished in 2016
Italian companies disestablished in 2016
Italian companies established in 1925